Sergio D'Asnasch (born 5 August 1934) is an Italian former sprinter.

Biography
He competed in the 1956 Summer Olympics, he has 12 caps in national team from 1953 to 1958.

Achievements

See also
 Italy national relay team

References

External links
 

1934 births
Living people
Italian male sprinters
Olympic athletes of Italy
Athletes (track and field) at the 1956 Summer Olympics
Mediterranean Games gold medalists for Italy
Athletes (track and field) at the 1955 Mediterranean Games
Mediterranean Games medalists in athletics